Baaghi Sultana (English: Rebel) is a 1993 Hindi action film directed by R. Thakur. The film is produced by Raghunath Singh under the banner of Om Namah Shivay Productions. The star cast of the movie includes Anupam Kher, Kiron Kher, Shakti Kapoor, Puneet Issar, Raza Murad, Arif Khan, Vijay Saxena, Kirti Singh and Kiran Kumar. This film was released on 26 March 1993.

Cast

References

External links

1993 action films
1993 films
1990s Hindi-language films